Nicola Salerno, born in Matera, Italy, on August 3, 1956, is an Italian sporting director.

Career

Son of Senator Francesco Carmelo Salerno, former president of Matera, he started his football career in Serie C2 as sporting director from 1983-1984 until 1985-1986. He later worked as sports director and market manager at Ravenna, the Licata, with whom he landed in Serie B in season 1988-1989, and then at Trieste from 1989 to 1993.

After serving an initial disqualification as sports director of Messina from 1997 to 2002. Salerno was touted as one of the architects of the revival of the Giallorossi as they climbed in a few years from the National Amateur Championship to Serie B. In 2002-2003, after new leadership at Messina, Salerno left to join Catania, also in Serie B.

The following season he moved to Serie A side Cagliari Calcio where he started his working relationship with the then Cagliari owner Massimo Cellino, who won the championship of Serie B for 2003-2004, and he stayed until 2006.

After one season as sporting director at Foggia in Serie C1 from 2006 to 2007, where the Apulian side earned promotion to Serie B in the last minute of the playoff final against Avellino.

Salerno then went back to Cagliari in 2007, but was dismissed in February 2008.

On 12 October 2009 he became the sports director of U.S. Salernitana 1919; after his resignation on 11 February 2011 subsequent to the start of the new owners at the helm of the club.

After the summer of 2011, after the experience with Salernitana, after having been in touching distance of a return to Serie B until losing the play-off final against Hellas Verona F.C. Salerno made a brief return to Messina (who had fallen to Series D), where he served as the technical advisor.  In November 2011, he was appointed as the new sporting director of Grosseto in Serie B.

In the summer of 2012, he was appointed sporting director of Catania, where he prepared to compete in Serie A 2012-2013, returning to the top flight again after experiencing Serie A with Cagliari.

On July 5, 2013, he returned for the third time to Cagliari after five years away, becoming the first head of the technical team and the business of football. When owner Massimo Cellino sold the club in June 2014, to concentrate on the ownership of Leeds United, Salerno left Cagliari straight away.

On 11 July 2014, owner Massimo Cellino revealed Salerno would be joining Leeds United on a 2-year deal.

On 2 April Salerno mysteriously suspended Steve Thompson, Leeds Assistant Manager who was credited with lifting Leeds from a place above relegation to 10th in the Football Championship. Leeds had won 6 out of the previous 10 matches. On 9 April 2015 Leeds United's suspended owner, Massimo Cellino, informed the press that he believed Salerno had resigned.

With Salerno still contracted to Leeds United, On 24 June 2015, it was announced that after Salerno had helped the club sign Sol Bamba from Palermo that Salerno and the club had agreed a mutual termination of Salerno's contract, with the club stating Leeds United would like to thank Nicola for his efforts over the past year and he will always be welcomed back to Elland Road in the future. On 24 June, Salerno gave a tell all interview to Sky Sports talking about his relationship with Cellino, Neil Redfearn and also the contract situation of Mirco Antenucci. He also talked about Steve Thompson, proclaiming "I had a bad relationship with Steve but I didn’t speak to Massimo about him."

On 24 June 2015, it was announced that Salerno has joined Premier League side Watford F.C. as Consultant, and would oversee the recruitment of Watford's oversees players.

On 16 January 2017, Salerno was appointed sporting director of U.S. Città di Palermo. He resigned on 11 April 2017.

References

1956 births
Living people
People from Matera
Italian football chairmen and investors